Providence Regional Medical Center Everett is a full-service medical center and the flagship hospital of Providence Health & Services, the largest faith-based healthcare system in the Northwestern United States. It serves patients from Snohomish County, Skagit County, Whatcom County, Island County, and San Juan County, Washington. Its two campuses are located in Downtown Everett, Washington.

The medical center was established in 1994 with the merger of the two hospitals in the city, Providence Hospital and Everett General Hospital. General Hospital became the Colby Campus site of the merged entity while Providence Hospital became the Pacific Campus site.

Providence Everett has over 3,000 employees and approximately 1,000 physicians on staff. It is currently licensed for 571 beds, with 448 at the Colby Campus and 123 at the Pacific Campus.

History
Before the existence of Providence Regional Medical Center Everett, there were two hospitals within the city of Everett: Providence Hospital and General Hospital Medical Center.

Providence Hospital first opened in 1905 when the Sisters of Providence purchased the Monte Cristo Hotel and converted it into a hospital with 75 beds. It was staffed by 11 Sisters and 3 other employees. In its first year, the new hospital served over 400 patients. In 1923, the Sisters of Providence borrowed $200,000 and built a new hospital with 126 beds adjacent to the old site. It underwent a further $14.5 million renovation in 1962.

General Hospital was founded by members of the Woman's Book Club of Everett in 1894, with the cornerstone being laid in an existing building at 3322 Broadway. In 1923, a group of businessmen rallied the community and raised $150,000 to purchase a new site and construct a modern hospital with 74 beds, which opened in 1924. It further expanded to 127 beds in 1949, and a seven-story, $782,000 patient care tower was completed in 1965. In 1990, the hospital elected to change its name to General Hospital Medical Center.

In 1994, Providence Hospital and General Hospital Medical Center merged, forming Providence General Medical Center. Rather than a merger of equals, Providence Hospital took over the operations of General Hospital, with the merged entity recognizing the founding of Providence Hospital as its own founding. The name was changed again in 2000 to Providence Everett Medical Center. In 2002, the five-story Pavilion for Women and Children opened at the Pacific campus. It was followed by the establishment of Providence Everett Healthcare Clinic in 2004. In 2007, Providence partnered with local care providers to open the Providence Regional Cancer Partnership, offering outpatient oncology programs. In 2008, to better reflect its role in the area, the hospital changed its name to Providence Regional Medical Center Everett. The Marshall and Katherine Cymbaluk Medical Tower opened at the Colby campus in June 2011.

PRMCE is one of several Level II trauma centers in the state of Washington. 

The first U.S. case of COVID-19 was identified in a patient at Providence Regional Medical Center on January 20, 2020.

In October 2019, professional and technical employees at the hospital represented by the United Food and Commercial Workers (UFCW) authorized a strike, citing what they perceived were inadequate offers from hospital administrators; both sides eventually reached an agreement on January 8, 2020, after the union announced plans to strike the prior week. More than a year later, on June 4, 2021, nurses at the hospital additionally represented by the union authorized a strike as well despite beginning negotiations with hospital administrators in October 2020; they also cited inadequate offers from the administrators along with major stress and resulting burnout due to the COVID-19 pandemic.

Locations
Hospital 

Colby Campus
 Critical and Acute Care
 ICU and CCU
 Surgery
 Telemetry
 Emergency Department
 Cardiac Surgery Single Stay Unit
Pacific Campus
 Outpatient surgeries with the ability to allow for overnight stays
 Transitional and long-term care
 Inpatient and outpatient rehabilitation therapies
 Inpatient and outpatient recovery programs for chemical dependency
 Children's health and developmental care

Pavilion for Women and Children (Pacific Campus)
 The Family Maternity Center
 Neonatal Intensive Care Unit
 The Pavilion Boutique
 Children's Center and Seattle Children's Everett
 The Breast Center

Providence Everett Healthcare Clinic 
 Quality access to care for those who have difficulty due to cost 
 Compassionate professionals and volunteers 
 Range of basic healthcare services

Providence General Foundation
 Raise funds to promote health and wellness through Providence Regional Medical Center Everett

Providence Hospice and Home Care of Snohomish County
 Management of health care problems and life-threatening illnesses
 Trained staff offers physical, emotional, and spiritual support 
 End-of-life care

Providence Medical Group
 Primary Care and after-hours walk-in clinics 
 Extensive range of specialty care 
 Convenient locations throughout Snohomish County

Providence Regional Cancer Partnership 
 Collaboration between four leading medical groups 
 All aspects of outpatient cancer care under one roof 
 Most sought-after technology available in Puget Sound region
 Commission on Cancer (CoC) accredited program

Rankings
In 2012 Providence Regional Medical Center Everett was recognized in: 
 Becker's Hospital Review "100 Great Hospitals" 
 U.S. News & World Report's "America's Best Hospitals" 
 Strong performance in Washington state 
 Top-ranking in Puget Sound region and Seattle metro area 
 Adult Specialty, high-performing in Pulmonology

The hospital is also the recipient of several HealthGrades awards. 
 5 Overall Hospital Awards in Emergency Medicine (2011, 2010), Patient Safety (2011, 2010), and Distinguished Hospitals for Clinical Excellence (2010) 
 4 Specialty Excellence Awards in Critical Care (2012, 2011, 2010), and Stroke Care (2010)

References

External links
Homepage
Providence Health & Services Website

Buildings and structures in Everett, Washington
Hospitals established in 1905
Hospitals established in 1894
Hospital buildings completed in 1923
Hospitals in Washington (state)
Everett
1905 establishments in Washington (state)